Ghulam is an Arabic word meaning servant, assistant, boy, or youth. It is used to describe young servants in paradise. It is also used to refer to slave-soldiers in the Abbasid, Ottoman, Safavid and to a lesser extent, Mughal empires, as described in the article Ghilman, which is the plural form of the word.

It is traditionally used as the first element of compounded Muslim male given names, meaning servant of ..., mostly in Persian (where it is pronounced ) and in Urdu. In both Persian and Urdu, the particle al- is not used with ghulam (unlike compounds formed with ʿabd; e.g. Gholammohammad, Gholamhoseyn, Gholamali... and Abd al-Muhammad, Abd al-Husayn, Abd al-Ali...). Since the 20th century, Ghulam has also been used as an independent given name and surname.

People with the given name (not in compound)
Ghulam Bombaywala, Pakistani-American restaurateur
Ghulam Ali Chowdhury (1824–1888), Bengali landlord and philanthropist
Ghulam Murshid, Bangladeshi author, scholar and journalist
Arbab Ghulam Rahim (born 1957), Pakistani politician
Ghulam Raziq (born 1932), Pakistani hurdler

People with the surname
Nabil Gholam (born 1962), Lebanese architect
Ali Gholam (born 1981), Iranian footballer
Sara Ghulam (born 1989), Canadian model
Jassim Ghulam Al-Hamd (born 1979), Iraqi footballer

List of compounded given names with first part Ghulam
Ghulam Abbas
Ghulam Ahmad, also Ghulam Ahmed
Ghulam Ali
Ghulam Azam (1922–2014), Bangladeshi politician
Ghulam Dastagir
Ghulam Farid
Ghulam Faruq
Ghulam Hassan
Ghulam Haider
Ghulam Hussain also Gholam Hossein etc.
Ghulam Ishaq, notably borne by
Ghulam Ishaq Khan (1915–2006), President of Pakistan
Ghulam Mansur, notably borne by
Ghulam Mansoor (born 1812), Subedar-Major at Bhopal State in 1867
Ghulam Mohammad, also Ghulam Mohammed, Ghulam Muhammad etc., notably borne by
Ghulam Mohammad Baksh Butt (1878–1960), Pakistani wrestler known as "The Great Gama"
Ghulam Mohiuddin, also other spellings
Ghulam Murtaza
Ghulam Mustafa
Ghulam Nabi, notably borne by
Ghulam Nabi Azad (born 1949) Indian politician
Ghulam Qadir, notably borne by
Ghulam Qadir Khan (1920–1988), last ruler of the State of Las Bela in Balochistan, Pakistan
Ghulam Rabbani
Ghulam Rasul, also Ghulam Rasool
Gholam Reza, notably borne by
Gholam Reza Pahlavi
Ghulam Sadiq, notably borne by
Ghulam Sediq Wardak (born 1942), Afghan peasant inventor

See also
Ghilman, young servants in paradise or slave-soldiers in the Abbasid, Ottoman, Safavid and to a lesser extent, Mughal empires
Ghulam Khan, town in North Waziristan, Pakistan
 Abd (Arabic)
 Qul (Turkic)

Arabic masculine given names
Arabic-language surnames